William Henry Coleman (December 28, 1871 – June 3, 1943) was a Republican member of the U.S. House of Representatives from Pennsylvania.

Biography
William H. Coleman was born in North Versailles Township, Pennsylvania.  He graduated from the law department of Columbian University (now George Washington University Law School).  He served as mayor of McKeesport, Pennsylvania, from 1906 to 1909, and as clerk of courts for Allegheny County, Pennsylvania, from 1909 to 1915.  He became a delegate to the Republican National Convention in 1912.  He was admitted to the bar in 1913, and commenced practice in Pittsburgh, Pennsylvania.

Coleman was elected as a Republican to the Sixty-fourth Congress.  He was an unsuccessful candidate for reelection in 1916.  He resumed the practice of his profession, and died in McKeesport in 1943.  Interment in Richland Cemetery in Dravosburg, Pennsylvania.

Sources

The Political Graveyard

1871 births
1943 deaths
Pennsylvania lawyers
Politicians from Pittsburgh
People from McKeesport, Pennsylvania
George Washington University Law School alumni
Republican Party members of the United States House of Representatives from Pennsylvania